The Cobra is the name of a number of different fictional characters appearing in American comic books published by Marvel Comics.

The most well-known Cobra is Klaus Voorhees, now known as the King Cobra. He first appeared in Journey into Mystery #98 (Nov. 1963) created by writer Stan Lee and artist Don Heck. Klaus Voorhees was a laboratory assistant, working with a professor trying to find a cure for various venomous snake bites. A combination of a bite from a radioactive cobra and the experimental anti-venom granted him superpowers, which led to him becoming the supervillain briefly known as the Human Cobra and then as the Cobra. The Cobra and Mister Hyde formed a criminal team for years, fighting various heroes such as Thor and Daredevil. He later became a member of the Serpent Squad and a member of Sidewinder's Serpent Society. During a takeover attempt by the Viper, the Cobra actually opposed her rule and sided with Captain America to depose the Viper and foil her plans. The Cobra later took the name "the King Cobra" as he assumed leadership of the Serpent Society. When the Serpent Society became Serpent Solutions under the leadership of the Viper (Jordan Stryke, a different Viper) the King Cobra became a member of the group.

His nephew, Piet Voorhees, became the second Cobra and first appeared in White Tiger #1 (Jan. 2007) in a story written by Tamora Pierce and drawn by Timothy Liebe. Piet Voorhees was injected with the same chemicals that gave his uncle his powers and he became the second Cobra, working as a mercenary. On one mission he encountered the White Tiger, who defeated him. The Cobra later joined the Serpent Squad, organized by Sin and would also work for HYDRA as a mercenary.

Marvel has also used the moniker "Cobra" for two World War II Nazi villains and also a mercenary enemy of Moon Knight.

The original Cobra has appeared outside of Marvel Comics, most notably in "The Mighty Thor" portion of The Marvel Super Heroes as well as in episodes of The Avengers: Earth's Mightiest Heroes and  Marvel Disk Wars: The Avengers.

Publication history
Klaus Voorhees was briefly known as the Human Cobra, then was known as the Cobra for many years and is currently known as the King Cobra. The Klaus Voorhees version of the Cobra was most commonly associated with Thor, Daredevil and, to a lesser extent, Captain America and Spider-Man. The character was created by Stan Lee and Don Heck in Journey into Mystery #98 (Nov. 1963) in which he first battled Thor.His next appearance (Journey into Mystery #105–106 (June–July 1964)) saw him team up with Mister Hyde for the first time (with Hyde being the brains of the team) and the duo had a few more encounters with Thor before their first battle with Daredevil in Daredevil #30–32 (July–Sept. 1967).

Fictional character biography

Klaus Voorhees

Klaus Voorhees was born in Rotterdam, the Netherlands. Klaus was an ex-convict and the Dutch laboratory assistant to Professor Schecktor, a scientist working in India and looking for a cure for venomous snake bites. Unsatisfied with his lower position, and intent on stealing Schecktor's discoveries, Voorhees killed Schecktor by using a cobra. In order to make himself look less guilty, Cobra let the cobra bite him as well. He used an experimental anti-venom for snake venom to cure himself, but denied it to Schecktor. The cobra was radioactive due to experimentation and in a process similar to that which granted Spider-Man his powers, Voorhees gained superhuman abilities similar to a cobra's. Thor's mortal form Don Blake had encountered Schecktor. As Thor, he met the dying man and learned what had happened and that Cobra was traveling to America. Cobra attempted to manufacture a cobra-serum to transform others into similarly-powered slaves, but was thwarted by Thor. Although Cobra escaped using Jane Foster as a hostage.

As the professional criminal called Cobra, he fought Thor, Daredevil, and a number of other superheroes. Cobra and Mister Hyde were partners for years. They first joined forces to get revenge upon Thor, but were jailed. Cobra and Hyde were then bailed out and employed by Loki to kidnap Jane Foster, and Loki doubled their powers. Thor followed them to a house where traps had been set up for him. Hyde was defeated and then Thor manipulated the power supply of the house. Using his hammer, he sent a charge through the house that electrocuted Cobra. The weakened Cobra was forced out of a pipe next to Thor. He was easily defeated by Thor and left bound, before being arrested with Hyde. Cobra and Hyde then battled Daredevil for the first time. He later teamed with Hyde and the Jester against Daredevil.

Cobra later joined the original Serpent Squad with Eel and his brother Viper. With the Serpent Squad, he attacked Captain America and the Falcon. He subsequently joined the second Serpent Squad and battled Steve Rogers in his Nomad identity, then he became involved in an attempt to raise the continent of Lemuria up from the ocean. He became trapped with the second Viper and his cowardice earned her enmity.

Later, Cobra assisted Hyde in an attempt to acquire Cagliostro's serum. Purple Man then mind-controlled him, and Cobra fought Daredevil in a prison courtyard alongside Hyde, the Jester, and the Gladiator, who were also mind-controlled by the Purple Man. Later, Cobra refused to take Hyde along on a jailbreak, effectively ending their partnership, and Cobra got into a battle with Spider-Man. Hyde then began stalking his former partner and battled both Cobra and Spider-Man.

Cobra then joined Sidewinder's crime cartel the Serpent Society. He teamed with Diamondback to locate the Scourge. Later, he went on a mission to poison Washington D.C.'s water supply. He also helped Captain America subdue the Viper. When Sidewinder retired, Cobra became the leader of the Serpent Society. He beat Mister Hyde in personal combat and then assumed a new costume and a new name called King Cobra. He later sentenced Diamondback for treason to the Society. He still leads the Society (complete with a new Sidewinder), though he also teams up with Mister Hyde on occasion.

King Cobra was later summoned by Zarrko to fight the Thor Corps. Upon arriving he attacked Dargo Ktor, a future version of Thor, before he tossed him to Tyrus the Terrible.

King Cobra was enlisted by Lucia von Bardas, the former prime minister of Latveria, and placed in her secret army of technology-based villains. She sent the army against Wolverine, Spider-Man, Luke Cage, Daredevil, and Captain America, the five heroes Nick Fury had sent to Latveria to stop Lucia's secret criminal funding. When the battle started to turn in favor of the heroes, Lucia turned all the armor of her technology-based villain army into a bomb. Nick's unknown agent Daisy defeated her and the army's lives were saved. King Cobra escaped the heroes during the resulting battle between Nick Fury and Wolverine.

After passing of the Superhuman Registration Act in the Civil War storyline, King Cobra was forced to join the Thunderbolts and be trained by the Swordsman, along with Ox and Unicorn.

In spite of this, King Cobra, Mister Hyde, Firebrand and Mauler attacked Yellowjacket, the Constrictor and other Initiative staff and trainees.

King Cobra was with the Serpent Society when they were robbing banks. King Cobra and the Serpent Society were then defeated by Hope Summers.

King Cobra was among the male Serpent Society members attended the Criminal Technology Show Expo, where MODOK had disguised himself as Arnim Zola. MODOK followed the men into the restroom where he beat them nearly to death as revenge for his murder many years prior. Iron Man, who had been working with MODOK and disguised as a HYDRA agent, suggested they hide the supervillains before they regained consciousness. However, King Cobra learned of this and alerted the rest of the supervillains in attendance to MODOK's and Iron Man's scheme, causing a fight to break out.

Piet Voorhees

Piet Voorhees is the nephew of Klaus Voorhees. Klaus injected Piet with the same mutagenic serum that first gave him his own superhuman abilities. Using these new powers for selfish means, Piet became a high-level international mercenary. He has performed operations in Southeast Asia, Bosnia, Central Asia and Chechnya.

More recently, Cobra has become involved with an international cartel known as Chaeyi. He has been working to get stolen passports and visas to illegal aliens. This operation has brought him into conflict with the newest White Tiger.

In a new costume, he has since turned up as a member of Sin's new Serpent Squad in the employ of the Red Skull. He broke Crossbones out of jail and later attacked the White House, but he was stopped by the new Captain America.  Cobra escaped with Sin in a helicopter and reported the incident to the Red Skull.

Cobra later appears as a member of HYDRA, led by Baron Helmut Zemo, who are planning to spread poisonous blood extracted from an Inhuman boy named Lucas. He and Armadillo later fight Sam Wilson, the new Captain America, until the Armadillo is convinced to turn on HYDRA and stops Cobra from killing Sam Wilson.

As part of the "All-New, All-Different Marvel", Cobra appears as a member of Viper's Serpent Society under its new name of Serpent Solutions.

During the "Opening Salvo" part of the "Secret Empire" storyline, the Cobra was with Serpent Solutions when they are recruited by Baron Helmut Zemo to join the Army of Evil.

In the prelude to "Hunted", Cobra was among the animal-themed characters that were captured by the Taskmaster and the Black Ant on Kraven the Hunter's behalf. He was grouped with the Rhino, the Scorpion, Stegron the Dinosaur Man, the Tarantula, and Vulture as the Savage Six by Arcade. In this appearance, the Cobra was identified by Arcade as the King Cobra.

During the "Sinister War" storyline, Cobra accompanied the Savage Six in attacking the movie theater that was playing the debut of the movie that Mysterio was involved in. When Spider-Man fought the Savage Six, he made a comment that he never fought this version of Cobra before.

Powers and abilities
Klaus Voorhees gained superhuman powers due to the combined mutagenic effects of the venom of a radioactive cobra and an experimental anti-venom. King Cobra is double-jointed, can dislocate and snap back into place his shoulders and hips at will, and has a phenomenal mastery of his musculature. Most notably, his amazing contortionist powers and slithery body let him break in, and escape from, buildings. He also has the ability to stick to walls or ceilings. Combined with his superstrength, agility, reflexes and reactions, coordination, balance, and endurance, they make him a formidable wrestler. King Cobra's bones are flexible and nearly impossible to break. King Cobra has moderate knowledge of street-fighting techniques. King Cobra wears a bodysuit made of reinforced synthetic stretch material; the torso section, helmet, and tail are made of a bendable plastoid and the entire costume is coated with silicon and graphite dust compound to make it slippery. King Cobra is also armed with special gadgets that complete his cobra likeness: he is equipped with a "cobra cord" (an unbreakable cable) to tie up his enemies (it is solid enough to resist even Thor's strength), can launch "cobra darts" (venom-filled projectiles) out of his wrists and release toxic "cobra gas". He wears spring-loaded wrist-shooters propelling "cobra-bite" projectiles containing a poison derived from cobra venom. He uses cartridge projectiles filled with various substances: acid, smoke, nerve gas, plastic explosives, etc. He wears micro-suction cups on his fingertips and toes, permitting him to cling to walls and ceilings. In the miniseries Toxin: The Devil You Know, King Cobra himself says:

Piet Voorhees possesses certain unusual physical powers derived from his mutagenically altered physiology which, among other things, help him simulate the movement of a snake by using his great degree of independent control over every muscle in his body, enabling him to slither across the ground (at up to 50 miles per hour) without using his arms and legs, simply by muscle contraction. All of the bones in his body, including his skull, are malleable and his muscle tissue is exceedingly resilient, making his body very flexible and pliant. It is nearly impossible for him to break a bone or tear a muscle. Cobra's flexibility enables him to slither into and out of very tight and small places. Through compressing his body, Cobra can fit into any hole or slot down to four inches (102 mm) in diameter. By using his flexibility to wrap himself about a victim's body and then exerting his full strength, Cobra traps that victim within his "cobra grip". Unlike his uncle however, Piet also possesses enhanced olfactory senses, which enables him to track his targets by way of their scent. He can also produce a toxic substance from his body which he calls his "cobra venom". He projects his venom at selected targets by spitting at them.

Other characters named the Cobra

Albri Leiricgrie
Albri Leiricgrie is a costumed villain who worked for the Nazis during World War II and was an enemy of the Human Torch and Toro.

Cobra (Nazi spy)
There was also a Cobra who worked as a spy for the Nazis during World War II and was an enemy of Namor the Sub-Mariner.

James Lardner
A few months after his brother Amos Lardner disappeared, James Lardner joined the CIA where he met Marc Spector, a.k.a. the Moon Knight. When Marc asked about James' brother Amos, James never talked about him. Three years later, James sought vengeance upon those who were involved with Operation: Cobra. Blaming Marc Spector, he launched a grenade at Marc's mansion, yet Marc survived. James later launched a grenade at Ravencrag Asylum. Meanwhile, Marc received Amos Lardner's corpse and went to Ravencrag to see if there was a connection. Marc Spector was present when James Lardner attacked. Marc changed into the Moon Knight and went after James Lardner, who used a gas grenade to escape. When in Paris, James went after Charles le Blanc, who was the head of Operation: Cobra. Marc Spector also investigated Charles le Blanc and encountered James Lardner. Marc Spector pursued James Lardner in a high-speed chase, where they were knocked unconscious upon colliding. The agents that worked for Operation: Cobra managed to capture James and Marc, only for Marc to escape. James, however, became the successful test subject that was dubbed Cobra. The next night when the Moon Knight went to investigate Charles le Blanc, Operation: Cobra sent Cobra to dispose of the Moon Knight. The Moon Knight had a hard time fighting off Cobra, until he spotted Charles le Blanc using his remote control and shot a dart at it. The dart shorted out the remote control, causing Cobra to go berserk. Charles le Blanc escaped to his car and started to drive off only for the Moon Knight to fire another dart at one of the tires, which caused the car to swerve and catch on fire upon colliding with a tree. When Cobra wanted to seek vengeance and started to lift the front part of Charles le Blanc's car into the air, it exploded and killed both Cobra and Charles le Blanc.

Other versions

Age of Apocalypse
In the Age of Apocalypse reality, Cobra is near-feral and a cannibal. He and Mister Hyde are known to prowl graveyards and attack anyone entering their territory.

House of M
In the House of M reality, the Klaus Voorhees version of Cobra is a member of the Hood's Masters of Evil. Before the Red Guard attacks Santo Rico, Cobra leaves the team alongside Crossbones, Mister Hyde, and Thunderball.

Earth-33900
In the Avengers series dedicated to the American Armed Forces, Cobra appears as the founder of the Serpent Society.

Ultimate Marvel
In the Ultimate Marvel universe, King Cobra is a member of the gang known as the Serpent Skulls.

In other media

Television
 The Klaus Voorhees incarnation of Cobra appears in "The Mighty Thor" segment of The Marvel Super Heroes.
 Klaus Voorhees / King Cobra appears in The Avengers: Earth's Mightiest Heroes, voiced by James C. Mathis III. This version is the leader of the Serpent Society. It is revealed in the episode "Prisoner of War" that he had been replaced by a Skrull infiltrator before he joined forces with his fellow prisoners to escape before rejoining the Serpent Society in the episode "Along Came a Spider...".
 Klaus Voorhees / King Cobra appears in Marvel Disk Wars: The Avengers.

Video games
 Klaus Voorhees / King Cobra appears in the Captain America: The Winter Soldier film tie-in game.
 Klaus Voorhees / King Cobra appears in Marvel: Avengers Alliance 2.

References

External links
 Cobra (Albri Leiricgrie) at Marvel Wiki
 Cobra (Nazi Spy) at Marvel Wiki
 Cobra (Klaus Voorhees) at Marvel.com
 Cobra (Klaus Voorhees) at Marvel Wiki
 Cobra (James Lardner) at The Appendix to the Hand book of the Marvel Universe
 Cobra (James Lardner) at Marvel Wiki
 Cobra (Piet Voorhees) at Marvel Wiki
 

Characters created by Don Heck
Characters created by Stan Lee
Comics characters introduced in 1963
Comics characters introduced in 2007
Fictional Dutch people
Marvel Comics characters with superhuman strength
Marvel Comics mutates